Anika Nilles is a German drummer, composer, solo musician, and musical educator. She launched her career on YouTube during the early 2010s, and has released two full-length albums to date, both with backing band Nevell: Pikalar in 2017 and For a Colorful Soul in 2020.

Early life
Nilles was born into a family with multiple drummers and started drumming at age six. When interviewed by South African Drummer, she mentioned having two uncles, one cousin and a father who are drummers. Her father "taught me the first grooves as he realised I was interested in drumming."

After school, Nilles had a career in social education, which she left to pursue drumming full-time. She earned a degree in popular music from the Popakademie Baden-Württemberg in Mannheim.

Career
Nilles posted her first original compositions "Wild Boy" in 2013, followed by "Alter Ego" in 2014. These and other music videos usually contain a visual recording of her drumming alongside previously recorded music. In such videos, she has historically cooperated with producer and guitarist Joachim Schneiss. Afterward, Nilles began acquiring work and viral attention outside of her native Germany, such as with a tour of Europe, the United States, and China in 2015. 

In 2017, Nilles' debut album Pikalar was released, consisting of 10 instrumental tracks. In promotion of the album, Nilles was the cover artist and interviewee for the June 2017 edition of Modern Drummer Magazine. In this interview, Nilles stated that she coined the word "pikalar", which is intended "to stand for things that happen in life that you can't describe".

Nilles embarked on a six-date United States clinic tour in October 2018, and performed at venues such as the Chicago Music Exchange, Sweetwater Sound in Fort Wayne, Indiana, and Salt City Drums in Salt Lake City, Utah. Her second full length album "For A Colorful Soul" (feat. her band Nevell) was released in 2020. It reached number 3 of the US-iTunes-Top40-Jazzcharts as well as number 3 in Germany. Nilles teaches at Nexus ICA (UK), at DRUMEO (Canada) and at Popakademie Baden-Württemberg (GER). Since 2021, she is also head of the drums department at Popakademie Baden-Württemberg. Nilles' joined Jeff Beck's live band for his European tour in 2022.

Influences
Toto member and career session drummer Jeff Porcaro is a primary influence for Nilles. Other influences include Carter Beauford, Jojo Mayer, Sheryl Crow, Joe Satriani, Dave Matthews Band, Joss Stone, Stanton Moore, and Prince.

Critical reception
Nilles was twice elected as the "#1 Rising Star" in DRUM! magazine. The first time in 2015 and the second time in the following year. She also won the "Modern Drummer Readers Poll" for "Up And Coming Artist" in 2016. Furthermore, she was voted as "#2 Best Fusion Drummer" in DRUM! magazine and as "#3 best educator" on Drummie awards in 2017. Later on, she was elected as #1 "best clinician" on MusicRadar in 2018 and as #3 in 2019.

Equipment
Nilles has endorsed Meinl Cymbals, Tama Drums, and Evans Drumheads. Meinl released a custom 18" Artist Concept Model Deep Hats cymbal that was conceptualized by Nilles. She also uses Promark sticks, and formerly Mapex Drums.

Technique
Nilles tends to incorporate alternate note groupings, such as with quintuplets and sextuplets, over a  backbeat.

Awards

Personal
Nilles currently lives in Mannheim, Germany.

Discography
"Chary Life" (Sakurai Records, single, 2014)
"Synergy" (Sakurai Records, single, 2015)
Pikalar (Sakurai Records, full-length, 2017)
For a Colorful Soul (Sakurai Records, full-length, 2020)
"Florida" (Sakurai Records, single, 2021)
Opuntia  (Sakurai Records, EP, April 29, 2022)

Further reading

 Bin Muhammad Moritoshi, Mamoru Iwasaki (2021). Eksplorasi Teknik Sinkopasi Drum Set dalam Sukat A Simetris pada Lagu Spunky Karya Anika Nilles. Institut Seni Indonesia Yogyakarta.
Anika Nilles: Pad Book, Alfred Publishing, Los Angeles, 2020. , 
Wilting, Matthis (2020). Quintolische Grooves. Hochschule für Musik Nürnberg. 
An Analysis of the Drum Techniques of Anika Nilles - Focused on odd tuplet (2018). Popular Music Contents Society.
Stadnicki, Daniel A. (2017). "Play like Jay: Pedagogies of drum kit performance after J Dilla". Journal of Popular Music Education. Vol. 1, No. 3. .
 Lindroth, Niklas (2016). Skevt sväng. Att spela med kvintoler och septoler. Luleå tekniska universitet.

References

External links
Anika Nilles on Instagram
Official website
Drummerworld Profile

1983 births
Living people
Women drummers
German drummers
21st-century women musicians
21st-century drummers
Musicians from Mannheim